Kansas's 5th Senate district is one of 40 districts in the Kansas Senate. It has been represented by Republican Kevin Braun since his appointment in 2018; Braun was defeated by Democrat Jeff Pittman in 2020.

Geography
District 5 covers parts of Leavenworth and Wyandotte Counties, stretching from Bonner Springs, Edwardsville, and western Kansas City in the south to Lansing and Leavenworth in the north.

The district overlaps with Kansas's 2nd and 3rd congressional districts, and with the 33rd, 36th, 40th, 41st, and 42nd districts of the Kansas House of Representatives. It borders the state of Missouri.

Recent election results

2020
In 2018, incumbent Republican Steve Fitzgerald resigned from the Senate, and pharmaceutical operative Kevin Braun was chosen to serve the remainder of Fitzgerald's term.

2016

2012

Federal and statewide results in District 5

References

5
Leavenworth County, Kansas
Wyandotte County, Kansas